Holiday in the Sun is a 2001 American direct-to-video romantic adventure family film directed by Steve Purcell and starring Mary-Kate and Ashley Olsen as two teenagers on vacation at Atlantis Paradise Island.

Plot
Madison (Mary-Kate Olsen) and Alex (Ashley Olsen) Stewart are twin sisters from Illinois who are whisked away to Atlantis Resort in The Bahamas by their parents for winter break. Initially, the sisters are disappointed that they didn't get to go to Hawaii with their friends, but overcome it by enjoying their newly earned freedom in the form of their own suite, as well as the pristine beaches of the Caribbean.

Alex falls for "hottie" Jordan (Ben Easter), a worker at the resort. She's not the only one with her eye on Jordan – the spoiled heiress, Brianna Wallace (Megan Fox) is also in love with him, and plays dirty to get her way. Madison, meanwhile, is being wooed by cute, but brainless, Scott (Billy Aaron Brown), who in turn is being coached behind the scenes by Griffen (Austin Nichols), a childhood friend of Madison's with a not-so-subtle crush, to talk to Madison and eventually get her under his thumb.

The sisters' holiday of fun in the sun is interrupted when they cross paths with a man smuggling stolen artifacts. Though their parents are keeping a close eye on them, the sisters and Griffen must find a way to clear Jordan's name when their friend is wrongfully arrested for the crime. But only together, they overcome everything and understand the true meaning of sisterhood, along with having a great vacation.

Cast 
 Mary-Kate Olsen as Madison Brittany Stewart
 Ashley Olsen as Alexandra Anneliese "Alex" Stewart
 Austin Nichols as Griffen Grayson
 Ben Easter as Jordan Landers
 Billy Aaron Brown as Scott
 Markus Flanigan as Harrison
 Jamie Rose as Judy
 Jeff Altman as Chad
 Wendy Schaal as Jill
 Ashley Hughes as Keegan
 Megan Fox as Brianna Wallace
 Ashley Kelly as Trish
 Sterling Rice as Carmen
 Phillip Sands as Ziggy
 C.J. Ansell as Good Looking Kid
 Ben Christian as Boy in Club
 Spencer Roberts as Surfer
 Jason Deveaux as Stan
 Ben J. Michaels as Jeffrey
 Gordon Mills as Teacher
 Chelera Bateman as Liz
 Cesar Alava as Champlaine
 Scott Adderley as Security Guard
 Tony Roberts as Policeman
 Dawn Forbs as Katherine
 Steve Purcell as Director
 Rob Lundsgaard as D.P.
 Dale Russell as Chauffeur
 Eric Davis as Carriage Driver
 Tenby Turner, Enith Hernandez and Chris Bruck as Bikini Models
 Anaïs Lameche as herself at the party (Uncredited)
 Faye Hamlin as herself at the party (Uncredited)
 Anna Sundstrand as herself at the party (Uncredited)
 Rosie Munter as herself at the party (Uncredited)
 Brittany Galiano as herself on the beach (uncredited)

*Billed as 'Megan Fox' in opening credits, and as 'Megan Denise Fox' in closing credits.

References

External links
 
 

2001 films
2001 direct-to-video films
2000s teen films
American teen films
Warner Bros. direct-to-video films
Films scored by Steve Porcaro
Films set in hotels
Films set in the Bahamas
Films shot in the Bahamas
Films about twin sisters
Twins in fiction
2000s English-language films
2000s American films